Embo (IPA:[ˈiaɾəpɔɫ̪]) is a village in the Highland Council Area in Scotland and the former postal county of Sutherland, about  north-northeast of Dornoch.

On 16 July 1988, Embo declared itself independent from the rest of the United Kingdom for one day. The Prime Minister was Mr. Donald Ward. This was done to raise funds to convert the unused primary school in the village into a community centre.

The village issued its own currency, called the Cuddie. The rate of exchange was two Cuddies to the pound. Cuddies were accepted in the local public house, Grannies Heilan' Hame, in exchange for a measure of Clynelish Malt Whisky. The owners of the distillery, in nearby Brora, sponsored the bid for independence by issuing a commemorative label on 50 cases of Clynelish Malt Whisky – "The Spirit of Free Embo".

The Battle of Embo took place in 1245 between Scots and Vikings.

Bronze Age remains were excavated to the south of the village in 1956, other burials having previously been discovered in the area.

The school in Embo was designed by William Fowler in 1859.

Nancy Dorian's research of the local East Sutherland Gaelic dialect showed that in 1964, over 100 of the village's total population of fewer than 300 still actively spoke Gaelic, and that many more had a "smattering" or were perfect passive bilinguals. This percentage even briefly increased during the 1970s with "returners" to the village. Until the end of the 1970s at least, Embo was a bilingual Gaelic and English speaking community. Brora and Golspie had much smaller percentages of Gaelic speakers at that time.

As with the entire region of East Sutherland, the end of the 19th century and the collapse of the fishing industry coincided with the decline of Gaelic as the majority language of the people.

Embo is informally "twinned" with Kaunakakai on the island of Molokai in Hawaii.

Coul Links, an area of sand dunes protected as part of a Site of Special Scientific Interest (SSSI), lies to the north of the village. As of February 2019 a company led by American Todd Warnock is proposing to build a golf course on the links; the Scottish Government has referred the proposal to a planning inquiry, which will determine whether the development is to be permitted.

Transport

References

Populated places in Sutherland